The Great Jewel Robbery is a 1925 American silent crime drama film directed by John Ince and starring Herbert Rawlinson, Grace Darmond, and Frank Brownlee.

Plot
As described in a film magazine review, private detective Doris Dunbar, on the trail of stolen jewels, visits the Red Mill Inn jewel thief Hooper and playboy Steve Martindale are drinking. Hooper, in temporary fear of discovery, switches the jewels to Steve's pocket. Later, many complications arise when Hooper attempts to recover the jewels. Doris and Steve become prisoners in the thieve's hideout. Foiled when they attempt to escape, they are rescued by the police and decide to become partners in life.

Cast

References

Bibliography
 Connelly, Robert B. The Silents: Silent Feature Films, 1910-36, Volume 40, Issue 2. December Press, 1998.
 Munden, Kenneth White. The American Film Institute Catalog of Motion Pictures Produced in the United States, Part 1. University of California Press, 1997.

External links
 

1925 films
1925 crime films
American silent feature films
American crime films
Films directed by John Ince
American black-and-white films
1920s English-language films
1920s American films